The 1977–78 Lancashire Cup tournament was the sixty-fifth occasion on which the Lancashire Cup had been contested. For the first time in many years, there was a new name on the trophy as this time it was relative newcomers Workington Town who joined the league in 1945. Workington Town won the trophy by beating Wigan in the final by the score of 16-13. The match was played at Wilderspool, Warrington, now in the County Palatine of Chester but (historically in the county of Lancashire). The attendance was 9,548 and receipts were £5,038. After relatively little success in the competition, Workington Town had reached the semi-final stage in 1973, 1974 and 1975, had been runner-up in 1976, and now winner in 1977. They would go on to be runners-up again in 1978 and 1979.

Background 

The total number of teams entering the competition remained at last season’s total of 14 with  no junior/amateur clubs taking part. The same fixture format was retained, but due to the number of participating clubs, this resulted in one  "blank" or "dummy" fixture in the first round, and one bye in the second round.

Competition and results

Round 1 
Involved  7 matches (with one "blank" fixture) and 14 clubs

Round 2 - Quarter-finals 
Involved 3 matches (with one bye) and 7 clubs

Round 2 - replays 
Involved 1 match and 2 clubs

Round 3 – Semi-finals  
Involved 2 matches and 4 clubs

Round 3 – Semi-finals - replays  
Involved 1 match and 2 clubs

Final

Teams and scorers 

Scoring - Try = three points - Goal = two points - Drop goal = one point

The road to success

Notes 
1 * Wilderspool was the home ground of Warrington from 1883 to the end of the 2003 Summer season when they moved into the new purpose built Halliwell Jones Stadium. Wilderspool remained as a sports/Ruugby League ground and is/was used by Woolston Rovers/Warrington Wizards junior club.

The ground had a final capacity of 9,000 although the record attendance was set in a Challenge cup third round match on 13 March 1948 when 34,304 spectators saw Warrington lose to Wigan 10-13.

See also 
1977–78 Northern Rugby Football League season
Rugby league county cups

References

External links
Saints Heritage Society
1896–97 Northern Rugby Football Union season at wigan.rlfans.com 
Hull&Proud Fixtures & Results 1896/1897
Widnes Vikings - One team, one passion Season In Review - 1896-97
The Northern Union at warringtonwolves.org

RFL Lancashire Cup
Lancashire Cup